The rivière à la Loutre (English: Otter River) crosses the municipalities of Saint-Paul-de-Montminy and Sainte-Euphémie-sur-Rivière-du-Sud, in the Montmagny Regional County Municipality, in the administrative region of Chaudière-Appalaches, in the province of Quebec, in Canada.

Rivière à la Loutre is a tributary of the south shore of the rivière du Sud (Montmagny) which flows first southwest, then northeast to the south shore of Saint Lawrence River.

Geography 

The Loutre river has its source in a mountainous area in the first rang of the municipality of Saint-Paul-de-Montminy in the Notre Dame Mountains.

From its source, the Rivière à la Loutre "flows through a valley steeped in  according to the following segments:
  north-west, up to rang Sainte-Anne-Ouest road;
  towards the west, collecting a stream (coming from the east), until its confluence.

Rivière à la Loutre empties onto the south shore of the Rivière du Sud (Montmagny) near the boundary of the municipalities of Armagh and Sainte-Euphémie-sur-Rivière-du-Sud.

Toponymy 

This toponym appears on a map dated 1952.

The toponym Rivière à la Loutre was formalized on December 5, 1968, at the Commission de toponymie du Québec.

See also 

 List of rivers of Quebec

References 

Rivers of Chaudière-Appalaches
Montmagny Regional County Municipality